Mount Buggery may mean:

 Mount Buggery (Alpine Shire, Victoria)
 Mount Buggery (Wangaratta, Victoria)
Mount Buggery (Sandlewood, South Australia)

References